The women's high jump event at the 1986 World Junior Championships in Athletics was held in Athens, Greece, at Olympic Stadium on 17 and 18 July.

Medalists

Results

Final
18 July

Qualifications
17 Jul

Group A

Group B

Participation
According to an unofficial count, 26 athletes from 21 countries participated in the event.

References

High jump
High jump at the World Athletics U20 Championships